Bezold is a surname, and may refer to:

 Albert von Bezold, (1836-1868), German physiologist 
 Carl Bezold (1859–1922), German orientalist
 Clement Bezold, founder of the Institute for Alternative Futures
 Friedrich Bezold, (1842-1908), German otologist
 Wilhelm von Bezold, (1837–1907), German physicist, discover of the Bezold-Brücke shift